McCuish is a surname. Notable people with the surname include:

 Alexander McCuish (1843–1919), Canadian merchant and politician
 Angus McCuish, Scottish footballer
 John McCuish (1906–1962), American politician
 Robert McCuish (1923–1998), Canadian politician
 Roddy McCuish, Scottish politician
 Finlay McCuish (2005-present), Stinking Stinkbag